Blairsville is a borough in Indiana County, Pennsylvania, United States, located  east of Pittsburgh, and on the Conemaugh River. As of the 2020 census it had a population of 3,252.

History
Blairsville was settled in 1818 and incorporated in 1825. In the past, railway shops, foundries, machine shops, enameling plants, and manufactories of plate glass and lumber employed the residents. It was the seat of Blairsville College, a Presbyterian institution opened in 1851. Just outside of the city limits in Burrell Township, auto and diesel repair trade school New Village Institute has operated since 2021.

The Blairsville Armory and St. Peter's Episcopal Church and Rectory are listed on the National Register of Historic Places.

In 1902, the countryside around Blairsville became one of the first in Pennsylvania to have a woman, Anna J. Devers, appointed as a Rural Free Delivery carrier, delivering mail from the Blairsville Post Office.

M. C. Eignus (1844–1941), Illinois state representative, was born in Blairsville.

Geography
Blairsville is located in the southern portion of Indiana County, bordered by the Conemaugh River, Westmoreland County to the south and west and Burrell Township to the north and east.

Demographics

At the 2000 census there were 3,607 people, 1,631 households, and 983 families residing in the borough. The population density was 2,591.3 people per square mile (1,001.9/km²). There were 1,830 housing units at an average density of 1,314.7 per square mile (508.3/km²).  The racial makeup of the borough was 95.68% White, 2.99% African American, 0.11% Native American, 0.58% Asian, 0.06% from other races, and 0.58% from two or more races. Hispanic or Latino of any race were 0.06%.

There were 1,631 households, 25.4% had children under the age of 18 living with them, 46.8% were married couples living together, 10.1% had a female householder with no husband present, and 39.7% were non-families. 36.3% of households were made up of individuals, and 19.1% were one person aged 65 or older. The average household size was 2.21 and the average family size was 2.90.

In the borough the population was spread out, with 22.4% under the age of 18, 6.5% from 18 to 24, 27.3% from 25 to 44, 22.7% from 45 to 64, and 21.2% 65 or older. The median age was 41 years. For every 100 females there were 88.8 males. For every 100 females age 18 and over, there were 85.2 males.

The median household income was $30,625 and the median family income  was $38,585. Males had a median income of $32,563 versus $22,049 for females. The per capita income for the borough was $16,771. About 6.8% of families and 11.2% of the population were below the poverty line, including 15.7% of those under age 18 and 9.9% of those age 65 or over.

Education
Blairsville is served by the River Valley School District, formerly the Blairsville-Saltsburg School District.  The River Valley middle and high schools and  Blairsville elementary school are located at the intersection of Routes 22 and 119 in nearby Burrell Township.

References

External links

 Borough of Blairsville official website
 Blairsville Municipal Authority, water and sewer service
 Blairsville Historical Society
 The Blairsville Dispatch

Populated places established in 1818
Boroughs in Indiana County, Pennsylvania
1825 establishments in Pennsylvania